Ryan Oliver Howley (born 23 November 2003) is a Welsh professional footballer who plays as a midfielder for EFL Championship club Coventry City. He is a Wales under-21 international.

Career
A youth product of the Coventry City since the age of 6, Howley signed his first professional contract with the club on 24 November 2020. He made his professional debut for Coventry in a 2–1 EFL Cup loss to Northampton Town on 11 August 2021. On 24 April 2022, Howley won the EFL Championship Apprentice of the Season for the 2021–22 season.

International career
Howley made his international debut for Wales U19 in an friendly against Croatia U19, playing 45 minutes.

In September 2022 Howley was called up to the Wales under-21 squad., he made his debut for the U21's in the friendly defeat to Austria U21, on 27 September 2022, coming on to replace Oliver Hammond for the final eight minutes.

Career statistics

References

External links

CCFC Profile

2003 births
Living people
Sportspeople from Nuneaton
Welsh footballers
Wales youth international footballers
Wales under-21 international footballers
English footballers
English people of Welsh descent
Coventry City F.C. players
Association football midfielders